Sergei Vitalyevich Bozhin (born 12 September 1994) is a Russian football center back who plays for FC Fakel Voronezh.

Club career
He made his Russian Premier League debut for FC Krylia Sovetov Samara on 8 August 2016 in a game against FC Spartak Moscow.

On 27 June 2022, Bozhin returned to FC Fakel Voronezh.

Career statistics

References

External links
 
 
 

1994 births
Sportspeople from Samara, Russia
Living people
Russian footballers
Association football defenders
PFC Krylia Sovetov Samara players
FC Lada-Tolyatti players
FC Fakel Voronezh players
FC Torpedo Moscow players
Russian Premier League players
Russian First League players
Russian Second League players